Charles Richard Sharpe  (2 April 1889 – 18 February 1963) was an English recipient of the Victoria Cross, the highest and most prestigious award for gallantry in the face of the enemy that can be awarded to British and Commonwealth forces.

Charles Sharpe was a farmer's boy from Pickworth, near Bourne, Lincolnshire, who ran away from home to join the army at the age of sixteen. He had served with the 2nd battalion in the Bermuda Garrison before the war, arriving on the Western Front with that battalion 6 November 1914.

He was an Acting Corporal in the 2nd Battalion, Lincolnshire Regiment, British Army and 26 years old when the following deed took place during the Battle of Aubers Ridge in First World War for which he was awarded the VC.

On 9 May 1915 at Rouges Bancs, France, Corporal Sharpe was in charge of a blocking party sent forward to take a portion of the German trench.

He later achieved the rank of Company Sergeant Major. He left the army in 1928.

On return to civilian life, he worked at a number of jobs, notably as a physical training instructor to boys at the Hereward Camp approved school at Bourne.  In World War II a number of bombs were dropped on the approved school, a row of wooden huts adjacent to Bourne Woods that may have been mistaken for a military camp; Sharpe was injured.

The Medal
His medal is held by South Kesteven District Council, Grantham.

References

Monuments to Courage (David Harvey, 1999)
The Register of the Victoria Cross (This England, 1997)
VCs of the First World War - The Western Front 1915 (Peter F. Batchelor & Christopher Matson, 1999)

External links
Location of grave and VC medal (Lincolnshire)

1889 births
1963 deaths
Military personnel from Lincolnshire
Burials in Lincolnshire
People from Bourne, Lincolnshire
Royal Lincolnshire Regiment soldiers
British World War I recipients of the Victoria Cross
British Army personnel of World War I
British Army recipients of the Victoria Cross